Omruduiyeh (also Romanized as Omrūdū’īyeh and ‘Omrūdū’īyeh) is a village in Dehsard Rural District, in the Central District of Arzuiyeh County, Kerman Province, Iran. At the 2006 census, its population was 30, in 7 families.

References 

Populated places in Arzuiyeh County